Deeds may refer to:

Deed, a legal instrument used to grant a right.
Deeds (Software), a software package for designing and simulating digital systems
Sen. Creigh Deeds, an American politician, member of the Virginia Senate and Democratic Nominee for the 2009 Gubinatorial race of the Commonwealth of Virginia.
Mr. Deeds Goes to Town, a 1936 comedy film starring Gary Cooper.
Mr. Deeds, a 2002 remake of Mr Deeds Goes to Town starring Adam Sandler.